Marcelo Gracia Domínguez (born 2 April 1994) is a Mexican professional footballer who currently plays for Loros UdeC on loan from Monterrey. He was part of Mexico's national under-17 squad that won the 2011 FIFA U-17 World Cup in home soil.

Career

Club career
In 2020, Gracia moved to Brazil and joined Cascavel CR.

Honours
Monterrey
CONCACAF Champions League: 2012–13

Mexico U17
FIFA U-17 World Cup: 2011

References

External links

1994 births
Living people
Mexican expatriate footballers
Association football forwards
C.F. Monterrey players
Tlaxcala F.C. players
Atlante F.C. footballers
Loros UdeC footballers
Liga MX players
Ascenso MX players
Liga Premier de México players
Tercera División de México players
Sportspeople from Monterrey
Footballers from Nuevo León
Mexican expatriates in Brazil
Expatriate footballers in Brazil
Mexican footballers